Kendriya Vidyalaya, Rubber Board Kottayam is a Senior Secondary School located in Kottayam, Kerala, India.

It is an autonomous body working under the Department of Education, Ministry of HRD, Government of India. The school is aimed towards providing better education to children of central government employees(facing frequent inter-state transfers) serving in Defence and other public. The institution has 12 year groups with Science and Commerce streams at +2 level and is affiliated to Central Board of Secondary Education (CBSE).

History
The school was established on February 1992 with only 220 students and with a team of 16 staff, 10 teaching and 6 non teaching, which has grown tremendously since then. It was upgraded to the +2 stage with Science Stream from the session 1997 and 1998 and Commerce stream was introduced on 2005 . The Vidyalaya got its permanent building in July 2000. Currently, the Vidyalaya provides quality education in the Science and Commerce streams at +2 level. 

During the initial years, the classes were held in temporary rooms attached to the Rubber Research Institute. During the late 1990s rapid strides were made to expand the infrastructure, resulting in the Vidyalaya moving to its permanent building in July 2000.

Achievements and Honours 
The school is well- known all over India for the best academic results it produce every year. It has had 100% pass for the academic years 2007,2008 & 2009 in class X and had a pass percentage of 94.9% in 2010 in class X. In 2019 and 2020, the class X students have secured 100% pass percentage and has been keeping this record ever since. In class XII science, 10 out of 54 students have secured above 90% in 2010.

Facilities 
Class rooms (35)
Computer Lab (2)
Chemistry Lab
Biology Lab
Physics Lab
Library
Audio Visual Room (2)

List of Past Principals 
Mr. Ganguly
Mr. Somasundaram
Mr. Sarath
Mr. Ajay Babu
Mr. Bhanumurthy
Mr. Shankaran P. N.
Mr. Asok P. 
Smt.Sarada Chadrasekharan
Smt.Lavanya Emmanuvel
Dr. Joy Joseph (Current)

See also 
 List of Kendriya Vidyalayas

External links
Official Website
Twitter

References

Kendriya Vidyalayas in Kerala
Schools in Kottayam district